Deluxe City Campaign Set is a role-playing game supplement published by TSR in 1989 for the Marvel Super Heroes role-playing game.

Contents
Deluxe City Campaign Set is a campaign setting that describes the New York of the Marvel Universe in great detail.  One book (96 pages) covers what the GM needs to know to run a campaign based in New York City; the second book (64 pages) contains several scenarios set in New York City.

In reference to real life, the Guardian Angels have an entry in this campaign setting.

Publication history
Deluxe City Campaign Set was published by TSR, Inc., in 1989 as a boxed set containing a 96-page book, a 64-page book, and four large color maps.

Reception

Reviews

References

Marvel Comics role-playing game supplements
Role-playing game supplements introduced in 1989